The log sum inequality is used for proving theorems in information theory.

Statement
Let  and  be nonnegative numbers. The log sum inequality states that

with equality if and only if  are equal for all , in other words  for all .

(Take  to be  if  and  if .

Proof

Notice that after setting  we have

Generalizations

The proof above holds for any function  such that  is convex, such as all continuous non-decreasing functions. Generalizations to non-decreasing functions other than the logarithm is given in Csiszár, 2004.

Applications

The log sum inequality can be used to prove inequalities in information theory. Gibbs' inequality states that the Kullback-Leibler divergence is non-negative, and equal to zero precisely if its arguments are equal. One proof uses the log sum inequality.

{| class="toccolours collapsible collapsed" width="80%" style="text-align:left"
!Proof
|-
|Let  and  be pmfs.

with equality if and only if  for all i (as both  and  sum to 1).
|}

The inequality can also prove convexity of Kullback-Leibler divergence.

Notes

References
 
 
 T.S. Han, K. Kobayashi, Mathematics of information and coding. American Mathematical Society, 2001. .
 Information Theory course materials, Utah State University . Retrieved on 2009-06-14.
 

Inequalities
Information theory
Articles containing proofs